Hendra may refer to:

 Hendra (name), given name and surname 
 Hendra, Cornwall, England, the name of several hamlets 
 Hendra, Queensland, Australia, a suburb of Brisbane
 Hendra railway station, serves the Brisbane suburb 
 Hendra virus, broke out in Australia in 1994
 Hendra (Ben Watt album)